Alexandra Dulgheru was the defending champion, and won in the final 6-3, 6-4 against Zheng Jie.

Seeds
The top two seeds received a bye into the second round.

Qualifying

Draw

Finals

Top half

Bottom half

References
Main Draw

Polsat Warsaw Open
Polsat Warsaw Open